The Grammy Award for Best Global Music Performance is an honor presented to recording artists for influential music from around the globe at the Grammy Awards, a ceremony that was established in 1958 and originally called the Gramophone Awards. Honors in several categories are presented at the ceremony annually by the National Academy of Recording Arts and Sciences of the United States to "honor artistic achievement, technical proficiency and overall excellence in the recording industry, without regard to album sales or chart position".

History
The award for Best Global Music Performance, reserved for international performers exhibiting "non-European, indigenous traditions", was first presented at the 64th Annual Grammy Awards, held on January 31, 2022. The new award category is an addition to the Global Music field, which also includes the Best Global Music Album category which was introduced in 1992 as Best World Music Album. (In 2020, its name was changed to Best Global Music Album)

Recipients

See also

 Awards for world music
 List of cultural and regional genres of music
 List of Grammy Award categories

References

General
  Note: User must select the "World" category as the genre under the search feature.

Specific

External links
Official site of the Grammy Awards

World music awards